A consultative and facultative referendum on continuing with prohibition was held in Norway on 18 October 1926. Partial prohibition had been effective since 1917, and following a 1919 referendum, spirits and dessert wine had also been banned.

Partially caused by pressure from France, which saw its exports of alcoholic beverages fall, a referendum was organised to decide whether prohibition should be continued. Popular support for prohibition fell in all counties. It was overwhelmingly rejected in and around Oslo, as well as in other urban areas like Bergen. As a result, the law was abolished and prohibition brought to an end.

Results

By county

References

External links
Norwegian Bureau of Statistics

Referendums in Norway
Norway
1926 in Norway
Prohibition in Norway
Prohibition referendums
October 1926 events